Dharm is a 2007 Hindi film directed by Bhavna Talwar, starring Pankaj Kapoor and Supriya Pathak in lead roles. This is the debut film of the director, it addresses the theme of communal harmony. Most of it is shot in Varanasi.

At the 2007 National Film Award, it won the Nargis Dutt Award for Best Feature Film on National Integration. The film was premiered in the Tous Les Cinemas du Monde (World Cinema) section of 2007 Cannes Film Festival.

Plot

The story is based in Benares and is about Pandit Chaturvedi (Pankaj Kapoor), a highly revered and learned Brahmin priest. A baby is abandoned by a woman and brought to his house by his daughter. He agrees to adopt the child due to requests from his wife Parvati (Supriya Pathak) and his daughter Vedika (Ananya Tripathi). Life takes a turn when the boy's mother returns and says that she lost her child during the communal riots. After the family finds out that the boy is Muslim after they have become attached to him. The family gives back the boy to his mother. Chaturvedi engulfs himself in purification processes to cleanse his body, mind, and soul due to contact with a Muslim soul. By the time Chaturvedi thinks he is fully purified, the child reappears; seeking refuge, due to Hindu-Muslim riots and a group of people chasing a Muslim man to slay. This is when Chaturvedi realizes the true meaning of scriptures, that the true religion is humanity. The movie ends with a message of communal harmony that "Dharm is not just penance and practice, Dharm is unity, Dharm is brotherhood, Dharm is non-violent."

Critical reception
Dharma was premiered at the 60th Cannes Film Festival and became the closing film of the World Cinema Section at the festival; it was also the official Indian entry to the Festival. It was screened at 38th International Film Festival of India (2007), in Goa, and later went to film festivals like the Cancun Film Festival, Mexico; Asian Festival of First Films, Singapore; and the Palms Spring Festival, California. The film was awarded the Swarovski Trophy for Best Film at the Asian Festival of First Films.

At home, though it wasn't a box office success, it opened to excellent reviews from the critics and later the world rights of the film were acquired by Films Distribution, France.

Dharm was embroiled in a controversy in India, where it became one of the finalists for India's official entry to the Oscars, a race it lost to Eklavya: The Royal Guard.

Cast
 Pankaj Kapoor as Pandit Chaturvedi 
 Supriya Pathak as Parvati 
 Hrishitaa Bhatt as Mani
 Pankaj Tripathi as Surya Prakash
 K. K. Raina as Surya Prakash's father
 Daya Shankar Pandey as Pandit at the Ganga River Banks

References

External links

 Bhavna Talwar interview on her film Dharma

2000s Hindi-language films
2007 films
Films shot in Varanasi
Films about Hinduism
Films set in Uttar Pradesh
Best Film on National Integration National Film Award winners